Bertil Edgar Gärtner (13 December 1924 – 20 September 2009) was a Swedish Lutheran bishop of Gothenburg (1970–1991) and professor of New Testament exegesis at Princeton Theological Seminary, United States.

In 1969 Gärtner became provost of Gothenburg cathedral and on 24 July 1970 bishop of the Lutheran diocese of Gothenburg. Like his predecessor Bo Giertz, Gärtner was theologically conservative and High Church. He was the writer of a number of books about the ministry of the Church as well as on New Testament subjects and one of the Swedish church leaders opposing the ordination of women in the Church of Sweden, an episcopal Visitor of 
Societas Sanctae Birgittae from 1972-,
Pro Ecclesia from 1990-1997,
Laurentiistiftelsen from 1997-
and Markusstiftelsen from 1998-2009.

Bibliography
 The Temple and the Community in Qumran and the New Testament

References

External links 
 photograph of Bishop Gärtner
 The Experience of the Church of Sweden by Bertil E. Gärtner and Carl Strandberg from Man, Woman, and Priesthood, pp. 123-133, edited by Peter Moore, SPCK London, 1978
 Bertil bloggar, Bishop Gärtner's personal weblog

1924 births
2009 deaths
Princeton Theological Seminary faculty
Bishops of Gothenburg
Swedish Lutherans
Swedish theologians
Swedish people of German descent
20th-century Protestant theologians
Swedish expatriates in the United States